Here Today – Gone Tomorrow is the fifth album by Hitomi Yaida released on 15 August 2005.  The singles from this album were "Monochrome Letter" and "Mawaru Sora" .

Track listing

External links
Lyrics @ corichan

2005 albums
Hitomi Yaida albums